Margaret Louise Beane Seymour (born January 16, 1947) is an American lawyer who is a former United States district judge of the United States District Court for the District of South Carolina.

Education and career

Born in Washington, D.C., Seymour received a Bachelor of Arts degree from Howard University in 1969 and a Juris Doctor from Washington College of Law at American University in 1977. She was an equal opportunity specialist for the United States Department of Health, Education & Welfare from 1972 to 1979, and for the United States Equal Employment Opportunity Commission from 1979 to 1980. She was an attorney in the Office of Civil Rights of the United States Department of Education from 1980 to 1988. She was in private practice from 1988 to 1990. She was an Assistant United States Attorney of the District of South Carolina from 1990 to 1996, serving as the United States Attorney (interim) for that district from 1993 to 1996.

Federal judicial service

Seymour was a United States magistrate judge for the United States District Court for the District of South Carolina from 1996 to 1998. On September 9, 1998, Seymour was nominated by President Bill Clinton to a seat on the District of South Carolina vacated by William B. Traxler. She was confirmed by the United States Senate on October 21, 1998, and received her commission on October 22, 1998. On January 3, 2012, she became chief judge, serving as such until she took senior status on January 16, 2013. She retired on August 31, 2022.

See also 
 List of African-American federal judges
 List of African-American jurists

References

Sources

Confirmation hearings on federal appointments : hearings before the Committee on the Judiciary, United States Senate, One Hundred Fifth Congress, first session, on confirmation of appointees to the federal judiciary. pt.5 (1999) 

1947 births
Living people
20th-century American judges
20th-century American women judges
21st-century American judges
21st-century American women judges
African-American judges
Assistant United States Attorneys
Howard University alumni
Judges of the United States District Court for the District of South Carolina
People from Washington, D.C.
United States Attorneys for the District of South Carolina
United States district court judges appointed by Bill Clinton
United States magistrate judges
Washington College of Law alumni